Commercial intelligence is a form of open-source intelligence practiced by diverse international and local businesses.
Business Intelligence is a misnomer for data mining and enterprise dashboards that present useful patterns or distillations of internal information to the executive.

What is Commercial Intelligence?
Commercial Intelligence (CI) is the process of defining, gathering, analyzing and distributing accurate and relevant intelligence regarding the products, customers, competitors, business environment and the organization itself. This methodical program affects the organization's tactics, decisions and operations.

Who uses Commercial Intelligence?
A 1998 study by the Futures Group, a Glastonbury, Connecticut-based consulting firm, indicates that 82% of companies with annual revenues exceeding $10 billion and 60% of those with annual revenues exceeding $1 billion now have an organized intelligence system. While most larger companies have specific departments devoted to Commercial Intelligence, mid-sized companies tend to hire Commercial Intelligence firms, and smaller business owners are more likely to do it themselves.

What Commercial Intelligence Could We Use?
Commercial Intelligence can be obtained and analysed in various ways that include:
 Information on a supplier's financial performance
 Political developments
 Economic indicators
 New product development
 Currency market movements
 Competitor performance
 New market entrants

Primary Vs Secondary Intelligence

Primary Sources of Intelligence
Primary sources of CI include:
 Speeches by executive managers concerning future strategies and tactics of the company and company literature shared at trade shows, conferences and other events.
 All forms of communication mediums such as TV, Radio, Business magazines, etc.
 Annual reports.
 Physical observations of activities.
 Conversations with internal sources known to be knowledgeable about the competitor's operations and decision making
 Conversation with ex-company employees
 Conversations with consultants or agencies of the company

Secondary Sources of Intelligence
Secondary sources of CI include:
 Articles and reviews created by someone outside the company concerning the company.
 Books about the company and/or the companies in the industry.
 Special studies, research papers and analyst reports.

Intelligence from both classifications can be found within the scope of open source intelligence (OSINT).

The Commercial Intelligence Cycle
Efficient and successful CI is a constant cycle that consists of 5 steps:
 Planning; deliberating with decision makers to discover their intelligence needs.
 Gathering; collecting activities that are conducted legally and ethically.
 Analysis; interpreting all the information gathered and assembling the suggested actions.
 Dissemination; presenting the findings to the decision makers
 Feedback; studying the decision makers’ responses and understanding their need for continued intelligence.

Ethics in Commercial Intelligence

Ethical Challenges

Misrepresentation
Misrepresentation in CI is a form of cyber engineering. It is the act of falsely identifying yourself and bluffing people into giving you personal information they wouldn't normally give. Misrepresentation is the most common issue that subdivides numerous CI practitioners in many unclear ethical issues. The most common types of misrepresentation include:
 Excluding specific details in one's identity: Lying about one's identity in order to gain access to certain information is known to be unethical amongst CI practitioners. However, there is a thin line between lying about one's identity and omitting certain details about it. Some practitioners believe that it is acceptable to deliberately skip over some details to obtain information. For example: Person X is both a part-time student as well as a director to a large company. As part of a school assignment, X is expected to collect information about a company that just so happens to be one of X's employer's biggest competitors. In this case, it is believed by some CI practitioners that not revealing the fact that X works for the company in addition to being a part-time student is completely ethical. In other words, X is misleading the competitor into thinking the information given to him will be used to complete a school assignment and nothing more, although in reality he would be gathering commercial intelligence to present to his employer. However, these types of situations raise some ethical concerns because the competitor may not have provided certain information knowing X works for a direct competitor. The competitor was not lied to, but deliberately misled in order to give out specific information about the company.
 Overhearing classified information: Some CI practitioners believe that if you overhear a competitor's conversation in a public venue, then the information discussed that was previously classified becomes ethical for you to use to your advantage. They believe that it is not necessary to reveal their identity since the conversation occurred in an open and public place, and it is in fact the competitors’ fault that their information has been leaked because they should have been more aware or their surroundings and been more secure with their information. On the other hand, some argue that the CI practitioners are at fault because they deliberately planned on being in those surroundings in hopes to overhear some information, which raises concerns on the ethics of the matter.
 Not Disclosing true intent on how information will be used: Many CI practitioners are paid by their clients to get as much information about their competitors. In order to do so, they would survey the competitors and suggest to them that they are simply collecting industry information, all the while not revealing who they are working for, thus, not disclosing the true intent on how the information gathered is going to be used.
All 3 misrepresentation issues share a common theme, which is: “What is the intent of the CI practitioner?” Judging by a person's intent, we can conclude whether or not the situation is ethical or non-ethical.

Client Conflict
Client conflict means any situation in which a practitioner is faced with a conflict of interest between a former and current client. The practitioner must attempt to determine how to act in the best interests of several clients in the same or substantially related matter. This type of situation usually arises with CI practitioners who are consultants. However, a clear solution is obvious; the practitioners agree that they should never service competing clients at the same time in order to keep classified information secure. In addition, another conflict may arise in the CI consultant and client relationship. The client usually hires the consultant to gather as much information about their competitors. However, there is an ethical issue concerning the length in which a consultant would go in order to retrieve the required information; how much is too much? When the consultant ignores the cost at which they are seeking this information, they tend to stumble upon various ethical issues, and it is in fact these ethical issues which the clients don't want to be associated with that push them to hiring a CI consultant.

Cases of Organizations accused of Unethical CI Practices

Oracle Corporation
In 2000, Oracle Corporation hired a detective agency to investigate two research groups that supported Microsoft during the antitrust trial. After attempting to buy garbage, the agency discovered that those two research groups were falsely identifying themselves as independent advocacy groups when they were in reality funded by Microsoft. Oracle and the hired detective agency may have acted in questionable matters to obtain that information, but they believe that the outcome justifies their actions. Larry Ellison, Oracle's chairman, says: “I feel very good about what we did. […] Maybe our investigation organization may have done things unsavoury, but it's not illegal. We got the truth out.”

WestJet
In May 2004, Air Canada filed a $5 million corporate-espionage lawsuit against WestJet after discovering that their rival had hacked into Air Canada's internal employee-only website over 243,000 times in a period of 10 months. WestJet used the confidential information it found to rearrange its load schedules as well as adjust routes and it significantly reduced service from the Hamilton airport and increased service in Toronto. WestJet later issued a rare apology to its rival and Robert Milton, the chief executive of parent ACE Aviation Holdings Inc, admitting that its actions of online snooping "were both unethical and unacceptable" and ended paying AirCanada $15.5-million in legal fees as well as donating $10-million to children's charities in the names of both airlines. Moreover, Hill, one of the founders of WestJet later resigned from his position as vice-president of strategic planning in July 2004.

Hewlett-Packard
In 2005, HP filed a lawsuit against its former VP, Karl Kamb, for $100 million, claiming Kamb had betrayed the company and appropriated its trade secrets as well as its money to start up his own flat-panel-TV company, as he was working on the TV project for HP. In January 2007. Kamb filed a countersuit. Not only did he deny stealing trade secrets but also claimed that HP was aware of what he had done with its money. He claimed that HP had asked him to gather classified information on Dell, whose entry into printers had threatened HP's most profitable line of business. In 2002, the CI unit hired Katsumi Iizuka, former president of Dell Japan until 1995, sold HP information on Dell's plans to enter the printer business. The information they gathered revolved around printer models, specifications, terms and prices, many months before their launch. Further more, HP was accused of pretexting, which is the act of lying about one's identity to obtain privileged data and information, in order to obtain Kamb's private phone records.

Society of Competitive Intelligence Professionals

Historic Development
The Society of Competitive Intelligence Professionals is one of the only global membership organizations in the rapidly growing field of competitive intelligence and business strategy. SCIP is a global not-for-profit association whose 7,000 members conduct competitor research and analysis for large and small companies, and help manage planning competitive strategy. Established in 1986 in Washington DC, it is currently headquartered in Alexandria, Virginia. It focuses on enhancing the success of its members through education, leadership, support and networking. Since 1986, SCIP has developed drastically and globally, and has, today, chapters all around the world as well as alliance partnerships with numerous independent affiliate organisations. On July 8, 2010 the SCIP Board of Directors voted to officially change the 25-year-old non-profit organisation's name from "Society of Competitive Intelligence Professionals" to "Strategic and Competitive Intelligence Professionals".

Chapters Overview
SCIP Chapters are the best way for members to build relationships within the competitive intelligence discipline in their area. Its event are open for anyone to attend, become involved, and enjoy the benefits of programming and networking. The SCIP offers many opportunities to its members including exceptional educational and networking experiences with leading industry experts, as well as opportunities to increase knowledge by gaining access to rare and distinctive practices, tools and publications. In addition, the SCIP offers Collegiate Chapters for students who show interest in the world of commercial and competitive intelligence. Participant students in the Collegiate Chapter are offered training and education programs that represent unique opportunities for professional advancement. They are also benefitting exceptionally in terms of leadership skills, career development and indispensable CI know-how. Also, the SCIP awards mentoring programs and scholarships to students who deem prominent, promising and capable business students.

Ethics
Economic espionage represents a failure of Commercial Intelligence, which uses open sources and other forms of ethical inquiry. Importantly, SCIP mandates that all this be done within a strictly ethical framework, which is why it has agreed upon a code of ethics;
 To continually strive to increase the recognition and respect of the profession.
 To comply with all applicable laws, domestic and international.
 To accurately disclose all relevant information, including one's identity and organization, prior to all interviews.
 To avoid conflicts of interest in fulfilling one's duties.
 To provide honest and realistic recommendations and conclusions in the execution of one's duties.
 To promote this code of ethics within one's company, with third-party contractors and within the entire profession.
 To faithfully adhere to and abide by one's company policies, objectives and guidelines.

See also
 Competitive Intelligence
 Business Intelligence
 Strategic Management
 Industrial Espionage
 Social Engineering
 Environmental scanning

References

Business intelligence terms
Competition (economics)
Competitive intelligence
Innovation economics
Open-source intelligence